The ATP Venice is a defunct, Grand Prix tennis circuit affiliated men's tennis tournament. It was held from 1981 until 1983 in Venice, Italy and was played on outdoor clay courts. During its last year, the tournament was titled the International Tennis Championships of Venice.

Finals

Singles

Doubles

Venice
Venice
Venice
Sport in Venice
Grand Prix tennis circuit